Toyamaken Gokoku Shrine (富山縣護國神社, Toyamaken gokoku jinja) is a Shinto shrine located in Toyama, Toyama Prefecture, Japan. It enshrines the kami of "martyrs of the state" (国事殉難者) and its annual festivals take place on April 25 and October 5. It was established in 1913.
Beppyo shrines

See also
List of Shinto shrines in Japan

External links
Official website

Shinto shrines in Toyama Prefecture
Gokoku shrines